The 1985–86 All-Ireland Senior Club Football Championship was the 16th staging of the All-Ireland Senior Club Football Championship since its establishment by the Gaelic Athletic Association in 1970-71.

Castleisland Desmonds entered the championship as the defending champions.

On 16 March 1986, St. Mary's Burren won the championship following a 1–10 to 1–06 defeat of Castleisland Desmonds in the All-Ireland final at Croke Park. It was their first ever championship title.

Results

Munster Senior Club Football Championship

First round

Semi-finals

Final

All-Ireland Senior Club Football Championship

Quarter-final

Semi-finals

Final

Championship statistics

Miscellaneous

 Portlaoise became the first team to win four Leinster Club Championship titles.

References

1985 in Gaelic football
1986 in Gaelic football